Melancholic depression, or depression with melancholic features, is a DSM-IV and DSM-5 specifier of depressive disorders.

Signs and symptoms
Melancholic depression requires at least one of the following symptoms during the last depressive episode: 
 Anhedonia (the inability to find pleasure in positive things)
 Lack of mood reactivity (i.e. mood does not improve in response to positive/desired events; failure to feel better)
And at least three of the following: 
 Depressed mood that is subjectively different from grief or loss (marked by despair, gloominess, and "empty-mood")
 Severe weight loss or loss of appetite
 Psychomotor agitation or retardation (i.e. increased or decreased movement, speech, and cognitive function)
 Early morning awakening (i.e. waking up at least 2 hours before the normal wake up time of the patient)
 Guilt that is excessive
 Worse depressed mood in the morning
Melancholic features apply to an episode of depression that occurs as part of either major depressive disorder, persistent depressive disorder (dysthymia), or bipolar disorder I or II. They are more likely to occur in patients with milder cases and in patients who suffer from depression with psychotic features.

Causes
The causes of melancholic-type major depressive disorder are believed to be mostly biological factors; some may have inherited the disorder from their parents. Sometimes stressful situations can trigger episodes of melancholic depression, though this is a contributing cause rather than a necessary or sufficient cause. People with psychotic symptoms are also thought to be more susceptible to this disorder. It is frequent in old age and often unnoticed by some physicians who perceive the symptoms to be a part of dementia. Major depressive disorder, melancholic or otherwise, is a separate condition that can be comorbid with dementia in the elderly.

Treatment
Melancholic depression is often considered to be a biologically based and particularly severe form of depression. Treatment involves antidepressants and empirically supported treatments such as cognitive behavioral therapy and interpersonal therapy for depression. A 2008 analysis of a large study of patients with unipolar major depression found a rate of 23.5% for melancholic features. It was the first form of depression extensively studied, and many of the early symptom checklists for depression reflect this.

Electroconvulsive therapy (ECT) was previously believed to be an effective treatment for melancholic depression, however studies since the 2000s have failed to demonstrate positive treatment results from ECT.

Incidence
The incidence of melancholic depression has been found to increase when the temperature and/or sunlight are low. 
According to the DSM-IV, the "melancholic features" specifier may be applied to the following only: 
Major depressive episode, single episode
Major depressive episode, recurrent episode
Bipolar I disorder, most recent episode depressed
Bipolar II disorder, most recent episode depressed

See also
Melancholia

References

Mood disorders
Major depressive disorder

fr:Mélancolie
io:Melankolio
zh:忧郁型抑郁障碍